Loewy (or Löwy) is a surname, and may refer to:

People
 Albert Löwy (1816–1908), British Hebrew scholar and religious leader
 Alfred Loewy (1873–1935), German mathematician
 Emanuel Löwy (1857–1938), Austrian classical archaeologist and theorist 
 Josef Löwy (1834–1902), Austrian photographer
 Maurice Loewy (1833–1907), French astronomer
 Michael Löwy (born 1938), sociologist
 Raymond Loewy (1893–1986), French-born American industrial designer
 Slavko Löwy (1904–1996), Croatian architect

Other
 Loewy (crater)

See also
 Loewi
 Lowy
 Löwe (disambiguation) (from Yehuda-Leyb)

Levite surnames
Jewish surnames
Yiddish-language surnames